Lixomorphus algirus is a species of weevil in the beetle family Curculionidae.

References

Lixinae
Articles created by Qbugbot
Beetles described in 1988